is a simulation
role-playing video game developed by Neverland and published by Marvelous Interactive Inc., Natsume, and Rising Star Games for the Nintendo DS handheld video game console.

Rune Factory is a fantasy farm simulation game and a spin-off of the Harvest Moon/Story of Seasons video game series, celebrating the 10th anniversary of the franchise. It is described by Yoshifumi Hashimoto (longtime producer of the Harvest Moon/Story of Seasons series) as "Harvest Moon where you wield a sword."

Gameplay

The game mechanics-wise stays true to its original roots. Like in most Harvest Moon/Story of Seasons games, every 10 seconds of gameplay ten minutes pass, in the game's world. Additionally, the player can still grow crops, and swinging tools for the farm but decreases stamina. However, the usual game mechanic of purchasing animals has been replaced by defeating monsters in dungeons, using a similar fighting mechanic to the SNES and GBA Legend of Zelda games. The player can befriend monsters, and in return, they help the player in battle or provide sellable goods. The player can also upgrade farm equipment to make the game easier.

Like most Harvest Moon/Story of Seasons games, Raguna is given a limited amount of stamina. Since Rune Factory is also a fighting game, the player is also given a limited amount of HP (hit points) which is equivalent to his life. This installment of the series' stamina is displayed on the upper left hand side of the DS touch screen, in a blue bar known as Raguna's "Rune Points". Rune Points are necessary if Raguna wishes to cast magic - a certain amount of RP is needed for each individual spell. Two magical spells are an exception to this, Teleport (in which Raguna instantly goes back to his home) and Escape (where Raguna is taken to the entrance of the cave, thus escaping a fight). Raguna's RP are essential to farm work, as using a tool, creating weapons/medicine, and cooking all decrease his RP. If Raguna does not have any Rune Points, daily chores and fighting will decrease his HP. Should Raguna lose all of his HP while doing farm work, he will merely collapse, but if he loses all of his HP while fighting in a cave, Raguna will collapse in the cave and the player receives a "game over". The player is then taken back to where he last saved the game.

Even if he has plenty of RP while fighting in a cave, the player will still receive a game over if a monster attacks him and he loses all of his HP. Some spells, such as Cure and Medication can be used to recover HP for a small cost of RP. While fighting in a cave, certain monsters can inflict different status effects on Raguna. For example, if Raguna is sealed he will be unable to use any of his magic. If he is poisoned, his HP will slowly decrease in small increments. If he is paralyzed, he will be unable to run. If Raguna has some RP, he can use Medication to remove most ailments, or create/buy medicine to remove it. Certain rings can be purchased or forged in Raguna's home to decrease the chance of being inflicted with a status effect.

RP and HP can be replenished most easily by sleeping at night. Cooking food can also slightly restores some of Raguna's HP/RP, and going to the local bathhouse run by Melody in the village will fully restore all HP/RP. However, while fighting in a cave, it is in Raguna's best interest to grow crops in the fields found inside every cave. Each cave is season-based, so Raguna can purchase and plant crops of a certain season in a certain cave (as specified by the sign outside of the cave). Raguna must go back to the cave to water them every day so they can fully ripen. Once they are ripe, a blue orb will appear above every 9 squares of the crops. If Raguna runs over the orb, he will replenish some RP. Usually by running over 3-4 orbs all of his RP can easily be restored. These orbs are better known as "Runes" and when Raguna has many patches of ripened crops, there will be Runes hovering over them, thus creating small "Rune Factories". As long as Raguna never picks the crops, the Runes will appear every day, and once Raguna steps over them, he will instantly replenish some RP, but that Rune will not appear again until the next day.

Story
The game takes place in Kardia, a small city on the eastern tip of the Adonia continent which is surrounded by farmland. The game opens with the protagonist, Raguna, wandering into town. Starved and dehydrated, he collapses in front of the house of a landowner named Mist. Raguna suffers from amnesia, and has no idea who he is or where he came from. Mist discovers him outside her home, fetches him food and water, and because he does not know his name, they both decide to name him "Raguna" (changeable). Afterwards, Mist offers Raguna a house on her land if he promises to work the farm. Raguna accepts, and this is where the game begins.

From then on, the game is very open-ended. The player can work on the farm, fish, or explore the caves in the wilderness around Kardia. The player can propose to some of the eligible girls in town, capture monsters, and expand the player's house. In short, the player is free to do what he desires, but the storyline will not progress if new caves are not opened up and cleared by beating the boss at the end. As the player fights their way through the caves, he slowly unfolds the mystery of the monsters attacking the village, and also begins to try to regain his memories of who he is and where he came from.

Reception

The game received "favorable" reviews according to the review aggregation website Metacritic.  In Japan, Famitsu gave it one eight, one nine, one seven, and one nine, for a total of 33 out of 40. IGN gave it an Editors' Choice Award and the award for the DS Game of the Month of August 2007.

References

External links
 Official site 
 

2006 video games
Action role-playing video games
Marvelous Entertainment
Neverland (company) games
Nintendo DS games
Nintendo DS-only games
Nintendo Wi-Fi Connection games
Rune Factory
Simulation video games
Video games developed in Japan
Rising Star Games games
Single-player video games